Carnevalsbilder (Carnival Pictures), opus 357, is a waltz composed by Johann Strauss II. The waltz is based on melodies from Strauss' operetta Der Karneval in Rom. Strauss conducted its first performance in Vienna on July 9, 1873. Oscar Straus later arranged the second waltz theme of Carnevalsbilder for his operetta Drei Walzer (Three Waltzes) as the soprano aria Ich liebe das Leben (better known in its French version as Je t'aime).

References

1873 compositions